Mirjam Gysling (born 2 May 1987) is a Swiss racing cyclist. She was the Swiss National Road Race champion in 2014.

References

External links

1987 births
Living people
Swiss female cyclists
Place of birth missing (living people)